Malaya Kurba (Baga Khurbe) is a rural locality (a settlement) in Khorinsky District, Republic of Buryatia, Russia. The population was 60 as of 2010. There are 2 streets.

Geography 
Malaya Kurba is located 143 km north of Khorinsk (the district's administrative centre) by road. Tokhoryukta is the nearest rural locality.

References 

Rural localities in Khorinsky District